Gol Babakan (also Romanized as Gol Bābākān and Gol Bābakān; also known as Golpāyegān) is a village in Poshtkuh-e Rostam Rural District, Sorna District, Rostam County, Fars Province, Iran. At the 2006 census, its population was 645, in 105 families.

References 

Populated places in Rostam County